The 2011–12 Toto Cup Leumit was the thirtieth season of the third most important football tournament in Israel since its introduction and the eighth under the current format. It was held in two stages. First, sixteen Liga Leumit teams were divided into four groups. The winners and runners-up were advanced to the Quarterfinals. Quarterfinals, Semifinals and Finals were held as one-legged matches, with the Final played at the Haberfeld Stadium in Rishon LeZion.

It began on the 6th of August, 2011 and ended on the 13th of December, 2011. Ironi Ramat HaSharon, making it their first Toto Cup title overall, due to the promotion in the previous season the club could not defend their title.

It won on the 13th of December, 2011 by Hapoel Ramat Gan.

Group stage
The draw took place on June 6, 2011.

The matches were played from 6 August to 25 October 2011.

Group A

Group B

Group C

Group D

Elimination rounds

Quarterfinals
The matches were played on 12 November 2011.

1 Score after 90 minutes

Semifinals
The draw for the Semifinals took place on 14 November 2011, with matches played on 29 November 2011.

1 Score after 90 minutes

Final

See also
 2011–12 Toto Cup Al
 2011–12 Liga Leumit
 2011–12 Israel State Cup

References

External links
 Official website 

Leumit
Toto Cup Leumit
Toto Cup Leumit